Erik Caniu (born 2 October 1988) is a Chilean handball player for Luterano and the Chilean national team.

References

1988 births
Living people
Chilean male handball players
Handball players at the 2015 Pan American Games
Pan American Games bronze medalists for Chile
Pan American Games medalists in handball
Medalists at the 2015 Pan American Games
21st-century Chilean people
20th-century Chilean people